Cerromaior is a 1981 Portuguese drama film directed by Luís Filipe Rocha. It was screened in the Un Certain Regard section at the 1981 Cannes Film Festival,  and was awarded the Colón de Oro at the Festival de Cine Iberoamericano de Huelva.

Cast
 Abel Vieira De Castro
 Titus de Faria - Carlos
 Ruy Furtado - Doninha
 Clara Joana - Ceu
 Santos Manuel - Maltes
 Carlos Paulo - Adriano
 Emília Rosa
 Amélia Varejão
 Elsa Wallencamp - (as Elsa Walenkamp)

References

External links

1981 films
1980s Portuguese-language films
1981 drama films
Films directed by Luís Filipe Rocha
Portuguese drama films